Middleton North was a stone-built railway station on the Wansbeck Railway between Morpeth and Reedsmouth, which served the villages of Middleton and Hartburn.

History
Due to financial difficulties the line was built in stages. At this time the Wansbeck Railway Company amalgamates with the North British Railway. It was only on 1 May 1865 that the line was completed. In 1923 the line and the North British Railway merged with the London and North Eastern Railway.

Little remains of the station today.

References

External links
Middleton North Station on Northumbrian Railways
Middleton North on a navigable 1956 O. S. map
The line on RailScot

Disused railway stations in Northumberland
Former North British Railway stations
Railway stations in Great Britain opened in 1862
Railway stations in Great Britain closed in 1952
1862 establishments in England